The European Motor Show Brussels is an auto show held biennial in the city of Brussels, Belgium. The number of visitors is around 600,000. The show is organized by FEBIAC and is scheduled by the Organisation Internationale des Constructeurs d'Automobiles.

History
The show was first organized in 1902 in the Cinquantenaire (Jubilee Park) in Brussels. The yearly Motor Show was interrupted between 1915 and 1919 because of World War I. By 1937 the exhibit area in the Jubilee Park became too small and the Motor Show moved to the Centenary Palace on the Heysel Plateau, in the North West of Brussels, only to be cancelled from 1940 to 1948 due to the Second World War. A third period of interruption occurred between 1957 and 1959 because of Expo 58, which occupied the whole Heysel Plateau.

In 1973 a separate show for commercial vehicles was set up. In 1978 Hendrik Daems, the then-Chairman, decided to henceforth reserve even years for passenger cars and motorcycles, and odd years for commercial vehicles. This alternating focus on commercial and passenger vehicles was maintained until the 2010s, when heavy truck and bus manufacturers left the Motor Show one after another, and the focus of what was considered the lesser event changed to leisure-oriented vehicles: off-roaders, pick-ups, sports cars, cabriolets and so on.

Editions

2023
It will take place between January 14 and 22 and will be the 100th edition of the motor show.

World premieres
 Mazda MX-30 R-EV

2022
The 2022 edition of the show, originally scheduled for January 14 to January 23, was canceled at the end of November 2021 due to the resurgence of the COVID-19 pandemic in Europe.

2021
Originally scheduled to take place between January 15 and 24, it was canceled due to the COVID-19 pandemic.

2020
It took place between January 10 and January 19.

Production cars
 Citroën C5 Aircross Hybrid
 Dacia Duster Eco-G
 Jeep Renegade 4xe
 Jeep Compass 4xe
 Kia XCeed Plug-in Hybrid
 Mercedes-Benz GLA (Type 247)
 MG ZS EV
 Renault Captur E-Tech Plug-in
 Renault Clio E-Tech

Restyles
 Jaguar F-Type phase 3

2019
It took place between January 19 and January 27.

Production cars
 Ford Mondeo Clipper Hybrid
 Jaguar F-Type Chequered Flag
 McLaren 720S Spider
 Opel Zafira Life
 Range Rover Evoque
 Škoda Scala
 Volkswagen Golf GTI TCR
 BMW 8 Series

Restyles
 Hyundai i40 & i40 Wagon

Concept cars
 Opel GT X Experimental

2012
The show was held from January 10 to January 22, it was the 90th edition of the motor show.

Manufacturers

Opel
SEAT
Volkswagen
Škoda
Audi
Porsche
Bentley
Lamborghini
Ferrari
Aston Martin
Maserati
Rolls-Royce
McLaren
Lotus
BMW
Mini
Mercedes-Benz
Smart
Jaguar
Land Rover
Citroën
Renault
Dacia
Peugeot
Ford
Chevrolet
Jeep
Lancia
Fiat
Alfa Romeo
Abarth
Volvo
Toyota
Mazda
Honda
Suzuki
Kia
Subaru
Mitsubishi
Nissan
Lexus
Hyundai
Isuzu
Ssangyong
Kawasaki
Yamaha
MBK
Harley Davidson
Triumph
Ducati
Aprilia
Gilera
Piaggio
Vespa
KTM

World premieres
Renault Scénic
Renault Grand Scénic
Peugeot 107
Toyota Land Cruiser V8
Toyota Aygo

European premieres
Porsche 911 Carrera 2S Cabriolet
BMW 3 Sedan
Mini Roadster
Nissan Juke S/V

Concept cars

Mercedes-Benz SLS AMG E-Cell
Mercedes-Benz A Concept
Volkswagen Golf Blue-e-motion
Renault Frendzy
Renault R-Space
Renault Zoe preview
Ford B-Max Concept
Ford Evos Concept
Toyota FT86 II Concept
Toyota Prius+
Toyota Prius Plug-in
Toyota Yaris HSD Concept
Nissan Nismo Leaf
Audi A1 e-tron
Audi R8 e-tron
Volvo V60 PHEV
Volvo C30 Electric
Opel RAK e
Peugeot EX1

BMW i3 Concept
BMW i8 Concept

Land Rover Defender DC100
Subaru BRZ Concept STI

References

External links
Official website

Auto shows